Nectandra grisea is a species of plant in the family Lauraceae. It is native to Brazil and Peru.

References

grisea
Flora of the Amazon
Environment of Amazonas (Brazilian state)
Vulnerable flora of South America
Taxonomy articles created by Polbot
Trees of Brazil
Trees of Peru